Isaac Meier Homestead, also known as "The Old Fort," Isaac Myer Homestead, Isaac Meyers Homestead, and Isaac Myers Homestead, is a historic home located at Myerstown, Lebanon County, Pennsylvania. It was built about 1750, and is a -story, 3-bay wide limestone residence.  It has a -story kitchen wing that pre-dates the main house.  It is one of the oldest buildings in Myerstown, and the home of its founder Isaac Meier.

It was added to the National Register of Historic Places in 1973.

References

Houses on the National Register of Historic Places in Pennsylvania
Houses completed in 1750
Houses in Lebanon County, Pennsylvania
National Register of Historic Places in Lebanon County, Pennsylvania
Colonial forts in Pennsylvania